The Journal of Regulatory Economics is a bimonthly peer-reviewed academic journal covering regulatory economics. It was established in 1989 and is published by Springer Science+Business Media. The founding editor-in-chief was Michael A. Crew (Rutgers Business School – Newark and New Brunswick), and the current one is Menaham Spiegel (Rutgers University). According to the Journal Citation Reports, the journal has a 2016 impact factor of 0.909.

References

External links

Economics journals
Publications established in 1989
Springer Science+Business Media academic journals
Bimonthly journals
English-language journals